Dimitrios "Takis" Parafestas (born 16 August 1953) is a Greek former football defender.
He started his career from Falaniakos and spent the majority of it with AEL in the Greek Super League.

International career
Parafestas appeared in one match for the senior Greece national football team, a friendly against East Germany on 15 February 1984. In 2003, when Larissa were playing in Third Division and were in the relegation zone, he was appointed manager of the club, managed to save the club from relegation in the last match of the season after taking a point at Chania in a 3–3 draw against the local club AE Chania. Next season he managed to promote the club to Football League (Greece) and then he resigned.

References

1953 births
Living people
Footballers from Larissa
Greek footballers
Greece international footballers
Athlitiki Enosi Larissa F.C. players
Association football defenders